2018 Avispa Fukuoka season.

J2 League

References

External links
 J.League official site

Avispa Fukuoka
Avispa Fukuoka seasons